Polaris Networks is a privately held company founded in 2003 and located in San Jose, California. It focuses on developing networking protocol software, and its products primarily include wireless protocol test tools and emulators for 3GPP LTE networks. 

In 2012, CERN selected the xTCA Test Tools developed by Polaris Networks for the internal testing of their xTCA systems, including those of the Large Hadron Collider.

In April 2013, Polaris Networks announced the cloud-based deployment of their NetEPC, a carrier-grade EPC which combines the functionality of the MME, SGW, PGW, HSS and PCRF into a single high-availability platform. And in June 2013, the Public Safety Communications Research Program used the Polaris Networks NetEPC to demonstrate deployable LTE at the Public Safety Broadband Stakeholder Conference in Westminster, Colorado. In June 2018, Polaris Networks and Nemergent Solutions completed interoperability tests between Polaris Networks’ NetEPC and Nemergent's Mission Critical Services (MCS) application server.

References

External links
Polaris Networks Website

Wireless networking hardware
Mobile web
Mobile technology
Companies established in 2003
2003 establishments in Massachusetts